This is a list of the number-one hits of 1962 on Italian Hit Parade Singles Chart.

See also
1962 in music
List of number-one hits in Italy

References

1962 in Italian music
1962 record charts
1962